Stavrianos may refer to:

L. S. Stavrianos (1913 - 2004), Greek-Canadian historian
Tony Stavrianos, Australia rugby league footballer
Stavrianos Vistiaris (16th-17th century), Greek poet